was a Japanese mathematician who made contributions to analysis and the theory of differential equations. He was a professor at Kyoto University.

He discovered the necessary and sufficient conditions on initial value problems of ordinary differential equations for the solution to be unique. He also refined the second mean value theorem of integration.

Works

 (posthumous)

References

1905 births
1948 deaths
20th-century Japanese mathematicians
Mathematical analysts
Academic staff of Kyoto University
Kyoto University alumni